Sangdaedeung (상대등, 上大等, the First of Daedeungs or Peers, Extraordinary Rank One) was an office of the Silla state. It was considered as the highest and most prestigious office that one could attain next to the throne itself. 
It was established during King Beophung's 18th year as a king (531) and survived until the end of Silla.

Selection
The Sangdaedeung was chosen from among those men of "true bone" (jingeol) lineage in Silla's strict aristocratic social order. He presided over the Hwabaek Council (화백, 和白), an advisory and decision–making committee composed of other high–ranking officials holding the office of Daedeung (대등, 大等). The council‘s primary duties lay in rendering decisions on important state matters, such as succession to the throne and declarations of war. Its existence dated back to the early Silla state and reflected that state‘s tribal origins. Throughout Silla history the Hwabaek Council led by the Sangdaedeung served as a check on the king‘s authority.

During the middle period of Silla, following that state‘s unification of the peninsula, the focus of government authority shifted from the Hwabaek Council and Sangdaedeung to the Chancellery Office (Jipsabu, 집사부, 執事部) and its Chief Minister (Sijung, 시중, 侍中, or alternately Jungsi, 中侍), an office instituted in Silla in 651 as the highest organ in the central government apparatus. This reflected the monarchy‘s efforts to curb the power of an independent nobility by relying on the Chinese inspired Jipsabu rather than the Hwabaek Council, whose existence was predicated on age old aristocratic and clan prerogatives. In the wake of several challenges to his authority King Sinmun dared even execute the Sangdaedeung Gungwan in 681 for complicity in the revolt of Kim Heumdol (김흠돌, 金欽突).

Despite these attempts to limit its power, the office of Sangdaedeung remained until the end of Silla the highest and most prestigious office one could attain short of the throne itself. In the later period of Silla, during which the throne was continuously contested, several monarchs emerged from the office of Sangdaedeung.

The Sangdaedeung was also referred to as Sangsin (상신, 上臣).

List of Known Sangdaedeung
 Noribu(579-588) 
 Sueulbu(588-?)
 Ulje(632-636)
 Kim Yongchu(636 -?)
 Bidam(645-647)
 Alcheon(647-654)
 Kim Kang(655 - 660)
 Kim Yushin(660 - 673)
 Kim Gungwan(679 - 681)
 Kim Yang-sang(774-780)

References 

Silla